Alvídrez is a surname. Notable people with the surname include:

Héctor Armando Cabada Alvídrez (born 1968), Mexican television journalist, television anchor, and politician
Octavio Alvídrez, CEO of Fresnillo